Hayat is a commune located in the Batna, Algeria.

References 

Communes of Batna Province